Kévin Klinkenberg  (born 4 October 1990) is a Belgian professional volleyball player. He is a former member of the Belgium national team. The 2013 European League winner. At the professional club level, he plays for Foinikas Syros.

Career
On 14 July 2013, the Belgian national team, including Klinkenberg, won the 2013 European League.

Honours

Clubs
 National championships
 2007/2008  Belgian Cup, with Noliko Maaseik
 2007/2008  Belgian Championship, with Noliko Maaseik
 2008/2009  Belgian SuperCup, with Noliko Maaseik
 2008/2009  Belgian Cup, with Noliko Maaseik
 2008/2009  Belgian Championship, with Noliko Maaseik
 2009/2010  Belgian SuperCup, with Noliko Maaseik
 2010/2011  Belgian Cup, with Noliko Maaseik
 2010/2011  Belgian Championship, with Noliko Maaseik
 2011/2012  Belgian SuperCup, with Noliko Maaseik
 2011/2012  Belgian Cup, with Noliko Maaseik
 2011/2012  Belgian Championship, with Noliko Maaseik
 2012/2013  Belgian SuperCup, with Noliko Maaseik
 2013/2014  French Cup, with Tours VB
 2013/2014  French Championship, with Tours VB
 2014/2015  French SuperCup, with Tours VB
 2014/2015  French Cup, with Tours VB
 2014/2015  French Championship, with Tours VB
 2018/2019  Turkish Cup, with Fenerbahçe İstanbul
 2018/2019  Turkish Championship, with Fenerbahçe İstanbul

References

External links

 
 Player profile at LegaVolley.it 
 Player profile at PlusLiga.pl 
 Player profile at Volleybox.net

1990 births
Living people
People from Oupeye
Sportspeople from Liège Province
Belgian men's volleyball players
Belgian expatriate sportspeople in France
Expatriate volleyball players in France
Belgian expatriate sportspeople in Italy
Expatriate volleyball players in Italy
Belgian expatriate sportspeople in Poland
Expatriate volleyball players in Poland
Belgian expatriate sportspeople in Greece
Expatriate volleyball players in Greece
BKS Visła Bydgoszcz players
Fenerbahçe volleyballers
Ślepsk Suwałki players
Outside hitters